Lomatium californicum is a species of plant related to the carrot and the parsnip which is known by the common names California rock parsnip, celery weed, and California lomatium.

This plant is native to California and Oregon.

Description
It has coarsely toothed to lobed blue-green leaves. They resemble those of common celery in both appearance and taste.

Uses
It is a traditional Native American food source and medicinal plant, with various parts of the plant used, including by the Kawaiisu, Yuki, and Yurok peoples. The Yuki chewed it while hunting to prevent deer from detecting human scents. The Chumash called it chuchupaste (lit. plant of great virtue) and used it to cure headaches and stomach pain.

References

External links
Calflora Database: Lomatium californicum (California lomatium, celery weed)
Jepson Manual eFlora (TJM2) treatment of Lomatium californicum
USDA Plants Profile for Lomatium californicum (California lomatium)
UC Photos gallery — Lomatium californicum

californicum
Flora of California
Flora of Oregon
Flora of the Klamath Mountains
Flora of the Sierra Nevada (United States)
Natural history of the California chaparral and woodlands
Natural history of the California Coast Ranges
Natural history of the Transverse Ranges
Endemic flora of the United States
Plants used in Native American cuisine
Pre-Columbian California cuisine
Plants used in traditional Native American medicine
Taxa named by Lincoln Constance
Taxa named by Mildred Esther Mathias
Flora without expected TNC conservation status